Jeffrey Lane Fortenberry (born December 27, 1960) is a former United States congressman. He served in the United States House of Representatives from 2005 to 2022, representing  as a member of the Republican Party.

In October 2021, a federal grand jury indicted Fortenberry on three charges of lying to investigators and concealing information about foreign campaign contributions. He was convicted of all three felony counts in March 2022. After the convictions, Speaker of the House Nancy Pelosi and House Minority Leader Kevin McCarthy called upon Fortenberry to resign. He officially resigned on March 31, 2022. In June 2022, he was sentenced to 2 years' probation, plus community service and a fine.

Early life, education and early career
Fortenberry graduated from Catholic High in his native Baton Rouge, Louisiana. He holds a bachelor's degree in economics from Louisiana State University, a master's degree in public policy from Georgetown University, and a master's degree in theology from the Franciscan University of Steubenville.

Fortenberry previously worked as an economist, in local economic development, and as a publishing executive for Sandhills Publishing. He was also a policy analyst for the Senate Subcommittee on Intergovernmental Relations. Fortenberry was an at-large member of the Lincoln City Council from 1997 to 2001.

U.S. House of Representatives

Elections

2004 

Fortenberry won the seven-candidate Republican primary to replace the retiring Doug Bereuter with 39% of the vote. He defeated Curt Bromm (33%), the Speaker of the Nebraska Legislature, and Club for Growth-endorsed businessman Greg Ruehle (21%). In the general election, he defeated State Senator Matt Connealy 54%–43%. He won all but two counties: Thurston and Burt.

2006 

Fortenberry was reelected to a second term, defeating former Lieutenant Governor Maxine Moul, 58%–42%, winning all but Burt County.

2008 

Fortenberry was reelected to a third term, defeating Marine veteran Max Yashirin 70–30%.

2010 

Fortenberry was challenged in the Republican primary for the first time since 2004. He drew two opponents and won with 84% of the vote. He was reelected to a fourth term, defeating legislative staffer Ivy Harper, 71%–29%.

2012 

Fortenberry drew two opponents in the Republican primary again, but won with 86% of the vote.

2014 

Fortenberry was reelected to a sixth term, defeating the Democratic nominee, attorney Dennis Crawford.

2016 

Fortenberry was reelected to a seventh term, defeating the Democratic nominee, physician Dan Wik.

2018 

Campaigning for an eighth term in October 2018, it was reported that Fortenberry's chief of staff threatened a professor at the University of Nebraska-Lincoln, Ari Kohen, who had liked a Facebook post depicting a photo of a vandalized Fortenberry campaign sign, raising the issue to Kohen's supervisor as well as the dean and chancellor of the university. In reaction, Kohen raised a complaint with the Office of Congressional Ethics, alleging a chilling effect on free speech.

Fortenberry defeated Democratic nominee Jessica McClure with 60% of the vote, but lost in Lancaster County.

2020 

Fortenberry defeated Democratic state Senator Kate Bolz with 59% of the vote.

Tenure 

During the week of April 12, 2021, Fortenberry made two false calls for emergency service to the United States Capitol Police through the emergency duress button in his Capitol office. The calls were apparently not for a genuine emergency, but only to check the agency's response time.

Political positions

Agriculture, energy, and environment 
Fortenberry served on the Subcommittee on Agriculture, Rural Development, Food and Drug Administration, and Related Agencies. He introduced the Renewable Fuels for America's Future Act of 2010, designed to reduce subsidies for the production of ethanol. The act would result in taxpayer savings of $5.67 billion, according to economists Ernie Goss of Creighton University and Bruce Babcock of Iowa State University.

In 2020, Fortenberry signed a forest management agreement and gathered producers across Nebraska to discuss growing the agriculture family through integrating big data, precision farming, and value-adds to maximize incomes of farms of all sizes. On August 4, 2020, a bipartisan initiative supported by Fortenberry, the Great American Outdoors Act, was signed into law by President Donald Trump. In September 2020, Fortenberry sponsored H.R. 3651, which serves to facilitate the use of certain land in Nebraska for public outdoor recreational opportunities and for other purposes.

Healthcare 
Fortenberry voted against the Patient Protection and Affordable Care Act, but said in 2010 that he supported "the right type of [health care] reform", incorporating measures to reduce costs, improve outcomes and protect vulnerable people. He introduced H.R. 321, the SCHIP Plus Act of 2009, to offer eligible families the choice to retain coverage for their children in the State Children's Health Insurance Program (SCHIP) or using program funds to help pay for family insurance plans. He introduced H.R. 5479, aimed at protecting people with preexisting conditions.

In 2020, Fortenberry introduced Matt's Act, named in honor of one of his constituents who was diagnosed with type 1 diabetes at age 13. The legislation would allow prescription drug manufacturers to sell insulin directly to patients. Fortenberry claimed it would reduce the price of insulin by two-thirds.

Fortenberry introduced ACT for ALS to help people suffering from amyotrophic lateral sclerosis (ALS) gain access to new treatments. The act would have the Department of Health and Human Services guide a new public-private partnership for streamlined research and drug approval for ALS. As of late December 2020, over 270 members of Congress co-signed the legislation.

Foreign and military affairs 
In 2010, Foreign Policy magazine listed Fortenberry as a "new Republican powerbroker" on nuclear security issues. In an October 2010 endorsement, the Lincoln Journal Star called Fortenberry "uncommonly well-informed on international issues".

Fortenberry, and then-Appropriations Committee chair Nita Lowey co-sponsored the Middle East Partnership for Peace Act (MEPPA), which aims to ease tensions between Israelis and Palestinians by giving grants and loans to startup businesses.

In his role on the Appropriations Committee, Fortenberry advocated for funding to enhance Offutt Air Force Base facilities, STRATCOM facilities, and to provide a new runway.

Abortion 
Fortenberry received a 100% anti-abortion score from the National Right to Life Committee in a ranking of members of the 111th Congress (2009–2011). He spoke annually at the March for Life.

COVID-19 pandemic 
During the COVID-19 pandemic, Fortenberry supported the Paycheck Protection Program (PPP), providing small businesses with financial support throughout the pandemic. The program is estimated to have saved over 300,000 jobs in Nebraska. The state led the nation in PPP loans approved per capita.

Texas v. Pennsylvania 
In December 2020, Fortenberry was one of 126 Republican members of the House of Representatives to sign an amicus brief in support of Texas v. Pennsylvania, a lawsuit filed at the United States Supreme Court contesting the results of the 2020 presidential election, in which Joe Biden defeated incumbent Donald Trump. The Supreme Court declined to hear the case on the basis that Texas lacked standing under Article III of the Constitution to challenge the results of an election held by another state.

Following the Supreme Court's decision not to take up Texas v. Pennsylvania, and the Electoral College's certification of the election results, Fortenberry recognized Joe Biden as President-elect and congratulated him on his victory. He voted against invalidating the election results on January 6, 2021, saying, "As much as I supported President Trump to win, I believe the proposed remedy to election irregularities is inconsistent with my legal obligation and the guidance of my conscience. I took an oath to uphold the Constitution. My decision is consistent with that oath. I will vote to certify the election."

January 6 commission 
On May 19, 2021, Fortenberry was one of 35 Republicans who joined all Democrats in voting to approve legislation to establish the January 6 commission meant to investigate the storming of the U.S. Capitol.

Immigration 
Fortenberry voted for the Further Consolidated Appropriations Act of 2020 which authorizes the Department of Homeland Security to nearly double the available H-2B visas for the remainder of FY 2020.

Fortenberry voted for the Consolidated Appropriations Act (H.R. 1158), which effectively prohibits Immigration and Customs Enforcement from cooperating with the Department of Health and Human Services to detain or remove illegal alien sponsors of Unaccompanied Alien Children.

Committee assignments 
Fortenberry previously served on the Committee on Appropriations during the 117th Congress, but stepped down from all of his committee assignments on October 20, 2021, after being indicted for allegedly concealing information and lying to the FBI about illegal contributions to his campaign. His last committee assignments were:

United States House Committee on Appropriations
United States House Appropriations Subcommittee on Agriculture, Rural Development, Food and Drug Administration, and Related Agencies (Ranking Member)
United States House Appropriations Subcommittee on State, Foreign Operations, and Related Programs

Caucus memberships 
Fortenberry was known to serve on the below congressional caucuses.

 Republican Main Street Partnership
 Republican Governance Group
  Nuclear Security Working Group (Co-chair)
 Congressional Caucus on Beef
 Religious Minorities in the Middle East Caucus
 Friends of Switzerland Caucus
  Congressional Friends of Jordan Caucus (Vice Chair)
 Congressional Catholic Staff Association (Chair)
 United States Congressional International Conservation Caucus (Co-chair)
Republican Study Committee

Federal conviction and resignation
On October 19, 2021, it was announced that Fortenberry was being investigated for about $30,000 in illegal campaign contributions, funneled through three strawmen at a 2016 fundraiser in Los Angeles, that his 2016 campaign received from the Nigerian-born, Paris-based billionaire Gilbert Chagoury, who also made contributions to three other American political candidates. A federal grand jury in Los Angeles indicted him on one count of scheming to falsify and conceal material facts and two counts of making false statements to federal investigators. On March 24, 2022, Fortenberry was convicted of all three felony counts of making false statements to the FBI and concealing information about his campaign donations.

Fortenberry was quoted as saying after the trial, "We always felt like it was going to be hard to have a fair process here, so this appeal starts immediately", but he could not appeal until after sentencing. Fortenberry faced up to five years in prison on each of the three felony counts, as well as fines. He is the first member of Congress convicted while in office since Chaka Fattah in 2016.

Within days of Fortenberry's conviction, lawmakers from both parties called on him to resign from Congress. House Minority Leader Kevin McCarthy said on March 25, "I think he had his day in court... I think if he wants to appeal, he could go do that as a private citizen... But I think when someone's convicted, it's time to resign." On March 26, Fortenberry issued a written statement to his colleagues in the House that said, "Due to the difficulties of my current circumstances, I can no longer effectively serve. I will resign from Congress effective March 31, 2022."

On June 28, 2022, federal judge Stanley Blumenfeld sentenced Fortenberry to two years' probation, 320 hours of community service and a $25,000 fine.

References

External links

 
 
 

|-

1960 births
21st-century American politicians
21st-century American criminals
American economists
American Roman Catholics
Catholic High School (Baton Rouge, Louisiana) alumni
Catholics from Nebraska
Franciscan University of Steubenville alumni
Living people
Louisiana State University alumni
McCourt School of Public Policy alumni
Nebraska city council members
Nebraska politicians convicted of crimes
Politicians from Baton Rouge, Louisiana
Politicians from Lincoln, Nebraska
Republican Party members of the United States House of Representatives from Nebraska